De Rose Hill is a pastoral lease in the far north of South Australia.

Native title rights exist over the station, which are managed by the De Rose Hill-Ipalka Aboriginal Corporation.

External links
http://nativetitle.org.au/profiles/profile_sa_derosehill.html

Pastoral leases in South Australia
Stations (Australian agriculture)
Far North (South Australia)